Janet Afary is an author, feminist activist and researcher of history, religious studies and women studies. She is a professor and the Mellichamp Chair in Global Religion and Modernity at the University of California, Santa Barbara (UCSB).

Career
She received her M.A. degree from University of Tehran. In 1991, she received her PhD in History and Near East studies from the University of Michigan, in Ann Arbor. Afary is married to Kevin B. Anderson, a fellow professor at UCSB.

Her research fields includes politics of contemporary Iran and gender, sexuality in modern Middle East, constitutionalism, civil liberties, the public sphere in the Middle East, cinema and popular culture of the Middle East, global feminism, feminist theory, modern Transcaucasia & Central Asia: art and folklore. She is known for her writings and research on the Iranian Constitutional Revolution. Her articles have appeared in The Nation, the Guardian, and numerous scholarly journals and edited collections.

Afary is a professor of religious studies at the University of California Santa Barbara. She previously taught at in the History Department and Women's Studies at Purdue University. In the 1980s, she served as the coordinator for the Iranian Jewish Association of California. She has served as president of the International Society for Iranian Studies (ISIS-MESA), the Association for Middle East Women's Studies (AMEWS-MESA), and the Coordinating Council for Women in History of the American Historical Association (CCWH-AHA).

Bibliography

Articles

Books
 
 
 
 Pregnancy and Miscarriage in Qatar: Women, Reproduction and the State (Sex, Family and Culture in the Middle East), 2020 (Contributor)
  
 
 
  (Winner of the British Society for Middle East Studies Annual Book Prize)
 
  (Winner of the Latifeh Yarshater Book Award for Iranian Women's Studies, 2006)

See also 
 Politics of Iran

Honours and awards
 She was the recipient of the Horace H. Rackham Distinguished Dissertation Award from the University of Michigan. 
 Afary was awarded the Keddie/Balzan Fellowship by the International Balzan Prize Foundation for the 2008–2009 academic year to work at the University of California, Los Angeles (UCLA). 
 Dehkhoda Award for Distinguished Scholarship in Iranian Studies (Germany).

Sources

External links
 Contributors: Janet Afary, Britannica
 
 Afary, Janet's profile at Edinburgh University
 Janet Afary at Woodrow Wilson International Center for Scholars
 Contributor Profile: Janet Afary, Global Journal
 Janet Afary's publications, The University of Chicago Press
 Birds and Cages Amy Littlefield's review of Janet Afary, Sexual Politics in Modern Iran
 
 Janet Afary (Guest editor): Iranian Studies, Special issue: On gender a

Iranian expatriate academics
Iranian writers
Iranian women writers
Iranian emigrants to the United States
Living people
Iranian women academics
University of California, Santa Barbara faculty
University of Tehran alumni
University of Michigan College of Literature, Science, and the Arts alumni
Year of birth missing (living people)
Faculty of Letters and Humanities of the University of Tehran alumni